Merijn Tinga (Leeuwarden, the Netherlands, 1972) is a Dutch environmental activist. As the Plastic Soup Surfer he campaigned for reducing plastic pollution and the plastic soup.

Tinga used different campaign methods: kiteboarding and standup paddleboarding expeditions to raise awareness of the plastic soup problem, a motion for the Dutch House of Representatives that was adopted by the Dutch Government, judicial notices handed over by bailiffs to CEO's of companies whose products cause plastic pollution, collecting photo's of littered products and holding companies accountable for this, a lawsuit and covenants.

Biography

Plastic Soup Surfer 
Merijn Tinga studied biology, worked as a biology teacher and became a visual artist. Since 2014 he combined art and activism and campaigned against the plastic soup under the name of the Plastic Soup Surfer. Tinga carried out several expeditions. In 2014, he kiteboarded 350 km along the Dutch and Belgian coast on a kiteboard made of plastic litter he had found on the beaches, to raise awareness of the plastic soup problem. In the summer of 2015, he collected floating plastic as he sailed along the coast of Scandinavia. During this expedition, Tinga concluded that only cleaning up plastic litter will not solve this problem.

Campaign for the introduction of deposit fees for small plastic bottles 
In the period 2016–2020, Tinga campaigned for the introduction of deposit fees on small plastic bottles in the Netherlands. In 2016 he kitesurfed from Scheveningen, the Netherlands, across the North Sea to Lowestoft, England on a foilboard made of plastic littered bottles. With this trip, he drew attention to a petition for a deposit fee on small plastic bottles. In 2017, Tinga presented a petition motion that called for 90% less plastic littered bottles within three years, together with 57.000 collected signatures, in the Dutch House of Representatives. The petition motion was adopted by the Dutch Government. A deposit fee on small plastic bottles has been introduced in the Netherlands as of July 2021.

Bailiff and judicial notice 
In 2017, Tinga developed a new strategy: using a bailiff with a judicial notice. This legal instrument is a 'declaration of awareness' by which companies are formally informed of the pollution, dangers and consequences of the litter as a result of their products or packaging. From the moment that a judicial notice is handed over to the CEO, a company is no longer able to claim to be unaware of these facts.

Tinga used this strategy after a 1200 km standup paddle tour down the Rhine, From Source to Sea, on a standup paddleboard made of littered bottles. This way he managed to meet with the CEO's of soft drink manufacturers and Dutch retail companies that tried to block the introduction of deposits on small plastic bottles.

Campaigns against products causing plastic pollution 
In 2018, Tinga and Dirk Groot (who, by the name of the Zwerfinator, campaigns against litter), started collecting photos of plastic litter as evidence of the pollution and approaching the manufacturing and retail companies together with a bailiff and a judicial notice to ask them to come up with solutions.

In 2018, Groot and Tinga approached the CEO of Pervasco, the producer of Anta Flu throat lozenges, after collecting 16.000 photo's of littered Anta Flu wrappers. As a result, Pervasco switched to biodegradable paper wrappers in 2020.

In 2019/2020, Tinga and Groot collected thousands of photo's of littered plastic shards of crackling balls, light fireworks, and plastic splash water balloons. Soon after preparing a lawsuit against the Dutch retailers of crackling balls, most retailers stopped selling this product. By signing the Crackling Ball Covenant, most Dutch retail companies pledged to stop the sale of all fireworks containing plastics. In 2020, Tinga and Groot convinced most retail companies to sign the Splash Plastic Covenant by which they pledged to stop selling plastic splash water balloons and plastic confetti.

The Plastic Avengers Manifest 
In 2019, Tinga organised a conference for Dutch actors in the field of plastic. They drafted the Plastic Avengers Manifest, a framework for a new way of dealing with plastic. Vice-president of the European Commission, Mr. Frans Timmermans, became the official ambassador of this Manifest.

Bibliography 
Merijn Tinga, Plastic Soup Surfer. Hoe één persoon verschil kan maken. Uitg. Hollandia 2021. ISBN 9789064107252

Filmography 
Eelke Dekker: Message on a bottle (2016). About Tinga's North Sea crossing on a kite foil.

Eelke Dekker:  From Source to Sea (2018). About Tinga's SUP tour down the river Rhine. The film was broadcast by National Geographic.

Eelke Dekker: Plastic Paradox (2019). Documentary about the 2017 Rhine SUP tour and the Plastic Avengers Conference, broadcast by National Geographic.

References

External links 

 Fighting against plastic pollution and plastic soup

Dutch environmentalists
1972 births
Living people
People from Leeuwarden